Hristo Naumov Shopov (born 4 January 1964) is a Bulgarian actor. Shopov's father, Naum Shopov, was a famous Bulgarian actor as well.

He is most noted for his 2004 portrayal of Pontius Pilate in Mel Gibson's The Passion of the Christ. Shopov revived his role as Pilate in the 2006 film The Inquiry. His dual roles as Pilate make him, along with Frank Thring, one of two actors to twice portray a character directly responsible for authorizing the crucifixion of Jesus Christ. He has become one of Bulgaria's most successful actors, making his debut in 1981 with Dishay, choveche (Breathe, Man!). His body of work includes many Bulgarian films such as Vchera (Yesterday) and Sledvay me (Follow Me). He has also appeared in several low-budget US film productions including Phantom Force, Target of Opportunity and Alien Hunter. In his homeland, he is best known for his role in the movie Vchera, which became a symbol of several generations. The movie tells the story of young Bulgarians studying in an elite English language school during Communist rule.

Mary Soan, an assistant director of the film I Am David, suggested that he would be suited for the role of Pilate to Shaila Rubin, who was casting the film. After Hristo and Gibson had a brief conversation, Hristo was given the part. Shopov also played the role of Pontius Pilate in the 2006 film The Inquiry, which also cast Max von Sydow as Emperor Tiberius.

Selected filmography

External links 
 
 www.hristoshopov.com – Biography, filmography, photos... of Hristo Shopov

Bulgarian male film actors
1964 births
Living people
Male actors from Sofia